Hollywood Babylon is a book by avant-garde filmmaker Kenneth Anger which details the purported scandals of famous Hollywood denizens from the 1900s to the 1950s. The book was banned shortly after it was first published in the U.S. in 1965, and remained unavailable until reprinted ten years later. Upon its second release in 1975, The New York Times said of it, "If a book such as this can be said to have charm, it lies in the fact that here is a book without one single redeeming merit." The Daily Beast described Anger's book as "essentially a work of fiction. There is no doubt that many—if not all—of the stories Anger shares in his slim bible have no merit." Film historian Kevin Brownlow repeatedly criticized the book, citing Anger as saying his research method was "mental telepathy, mostly".

Contents 
Originally published in French in 1959 by J.J. Pauvert (Paris) as Hollywood Babylone, the first U.S. edition of Hollywood Babylon was published in 1965 by Associated Professional Services of Phoenix, Arizona. A second U.S. edition was published by Rolling Stone′s Straight Arrow Press and distributed by Simon & Schuster, released in 1975 after a series of copyright conflicts.

The book details alleged scandals of Hollywood stars from the silent era through to the 1960s, including Charles Chaplin, Lupe Vélez, Mary Nolan, Rudolph Valentino, Marie Prevost, Mary Astor, Wallace Reid, Olive Thomas, Jeanne Eagels, Thelma Todd, Errol Flynn, Frances Farmer, Juanita Hansen, Mae Murray, Alma Rubens, John Gilbert, Barbara La Marr, Ramon Novarro, Jean Harlow, Carole Landis, Lana Turner, Judy Garland and Marilyn Monroe.

Hollywood Babylon also features chapters on the Fatty Arbuckle–Virginia Rappe scandal, the murder of William Desmond Taylor, the Hollywood Blacklist, the murder of Sharon Tate, and the Confidential magazine lawsuits.

Criticisms

Exploitation 
The book's 1975 edition featured graphic images such as the scene of the traffic accident that killed Jayne Mansfield, a photograph of Carole Landis after her suicide, images of director and screenwriter Paul Bern following his suicide, a photograph of Lewis Stone as he lay dying on a sidewalk, and uncensored images of the Black Dahlia's corpse.

Falsehoods 
Although many of Anger's claims have been denounced as untrue since the book's initial publication, it is nonetheless responsible for many oft-quoted urban legends. For example, it claimed that Clara Bow engaged in sex with the entire USC football team, including a young John Wayne, a fallacy which has been debunked several times. Bow's sons considered suing Anger at the time of the book's second release.

The book also claimed that Lupe Vélez was found drowned in her own vomit with her head in a toilet after she committed suicide by swallowing more than 500 sleeping tablets. There was no basis to the story; in 2013 the first publication of a death photo showed Vélez had been found on her bedroom floor.

Other debunked urban legends started by the book include claims that silent film star Marie Prevost's body was partially eaten by her dachshund after she died in her Hollywood apartment in 1937, and that Jayne Mansfield was decapitated in her fatal 1967 car accident.

The fallacies, myths, and exaggerations of Hollywood Babylon were the focus of season 10 of Karina Longworth's podcast You Must Remember This: "Fake News: Fact Checking Hollywood Babylon".

Sequels 
Hollywood Babylon II was published in 1984. It was greatly expanded in format but was not as well received as the first book. It covered stars from the 1920s to the 1970s.

Anger stated for years he intended to write a Hollywood Babylon III, and in a 2010 interview he said that it had been finished but was placed on hold, explaining, "The main reason I didn't bring it out was that I had a whole section on Tom Cruise and the Scientologists. I'm not a friend of the Scientologists." In 2008 a book titled Hollywood Babylon: It's Back!, was written by Darwin Porter and Danforth Prince and had no participation or association with Anger.  Anger was reportedly so upset he placed a curse on the authors (Anger is a self-proclaimed magician of the school of Thelema).

A television series based upon the books was produced for syndication in 1992–1993. Hosted by Tony Curtis, the series featured dramatic reenactments of stories from Anger's books, augmented by veteran actor Curtis relating Hollywood-based anecdotes of his own.

See also 
 Full Service, by Scotty Bowers
 Babylon, a 2022 film by Damien Chazelle depicting a fictionalized 1920s Hollywood that takes inspiration from claims featured in this book.

References

External links 
 The Cut and Paste Club (on plagiarism in a part of Hollywood Babylon II)
 

1959 non-fiction books
1965 non-fiction books
Books about film
Books about Los Angeles
Censored books
Works about the history of Hollywood, Los Angeles
Straight Arrow Press books
Works by Kenneth Anger